Corigliano-Rossano is a comune in the province of Cosenza in the Calabria region of southern Italy. It was established on 31 March 2018 by the merger of Corigliano Calabro and Rossano.

Etymology 
According to some interpretations, the toponym Corigliano derives from Latin Corellianum, meaning "Corellio farm";  according to other hypotheses, the name could be traced back to that of other toponyms of Southern Italy such as Corigliano d'Otranto, and therefore from the Byzantine Greek term "χωρίον" (transliterated choríon), respectively to the etymologically related term "χώρα" (chóra), with the meaning of village, town, farm, land or place, or oil village, from Greek choríon elàion.

The toponym Rossano, on the other hand, derives from Greek rusion, ρύσιον ("who saves") and akron, άκρον ("promontory", "height") from which the medieval versions Ruskia or Ruskiané (Ρουσκιανή) or Rusiànon (Ῥυσινάνάν in Byzantine Greek Greek);  according to another hypothesis instead it derives from the Roman family name to which the government of the "Castrum" could have been entrusted and which would have given the name of "Roscianum" to the urban center.

History 
Following a referendum held on 22 October 2017, in which the yes to the merger got 61.4% to Corigliano Calabro and 94.1% to Rossano, the Regional Council of Calabria subsequently approved the regional law no. 2 on 2 February 2018, which established the new municipality of Corigliano-Rossano on 31 March.

Geography 
Corigliano-Rossano covers an area of about 346.56 km², is located in the eastern strip of the Sibari plain between the Sila and the Ionian coast.
The territory includes soils of different geological origins, with different characteristics (rocks, clays, sands), which correspond to different types of flora. From the landscape point of view, tree farmings dominate (olive groves, citrus groves and orchards). In areas close to the coast there are also pine forests. There are two monumental oak trees in the area (one English oak and one Quercus virgiliana).

References